Elmer Osmar Ramón Miani (April 22, 1933 – May 25, 2014) was a Roman Catholic bishop.

Ordained to the priesthood in 1958, Miani was named titular bishop of Carciri and auxiliary bishop of the Roman Catholic Diocese of Córdoba, Argentina in 1983. In 1989, Miani was appointed bishop of the Roman Catholic Diocese of Catamarca and retired in 2007.

Notes

1933 births
2014 deaths
20th-century Roman Catholic bishops in Argentina
21st-century Roman Catholic bishops in Argentina
Roman Catholic bishops of Córdoba
Roman Catholic bishops of Catamarca